Joseph the Confessor was a 9th-century Archbishop of Thessalonica and brother of Theodore Stoudites. He is venerated as a saint by the Eastern Orthodox Church.

Together with his brother, they pursued a life of asceticism under the guidance of Plato of Sakkoudion in the latter's monastery at Sakkoudion, Bithynia. Later Joseph was unanimously elected archbishop of the city of Thessalonica. Together with his brother he spoke out against the illegal marriage of Emperor Constantine VI (the "Moechian Controversy"), for which, after the torment, he was imprisoned in a dungeon on a deserted island.

Emperor Michael I Rangabe liberated Joseph from prison. Under Emperor Leo V the Armenian, when the second period of the Byzantine Iconoclasm began, the bishop and his brother were again punished for venerating the holy icons. In prison he was tortured, but the prelate was unshakable in his faith. The emperor demanded that he subscribe to the iconoclastic confession of faith. For his refusal the saint was thrown into another, foul dungeon.

Under Emperor Michael II, Joseph, along with other monks who had been persecuted for the veneration of icons, were liberated.

He spent his last years in the Stoudion monastery, where he retired in 830.

Joseph is known as a spiritual songwriter. He composed the triodia and stichera of the Lenten Triodion, a canon for the Sunday of the Prodigal Son's Week and other hymns. He wrote several sermons for feastdays, of which the best known is the Sermon on the Exaltation of the Precious and Life-Giving Cross of the Lord ("Λόγος είς τόν τίμιον καί ζωοποιόν Σταυρόν").

Literature 
 Joseph the Confessor // Encyclopedic Dictionary of Brockhaus and Efron  : 86 t. (82 t. And 4 ext.). - St. Petersburg, 1890-1907.
 Orthodox Church of America - St. Joseph the Bishop of Thessalonica, and brother of St. Theodore of Studion 

8th-century births
9th-century deaths
8th-century Byzantine monks
9th-century Byzantine monks
9th-century Byzantine bishops
9th-century Christian saints
Saints of medieval Macedonia
Saints of medieval Greece
Christian hymnwriters
Byzantine hymnographers
Byzantine composers
Byzantine Iconoclasm
Studite monks
Year of birth unknown
Year of death unknown
Byzantine bishops of Thessalonica